Michael Affleck (born December 3, 1984) is a former American football quarterback who played one season with the Utah Blaze of the Arena Football League. He played college football at Utah State.

Early years
Affleck played high school football for the Timpview High School Thunderbirds of Provo, Utah. He was a Deseret News first-team all-state selection and U.S. Army All-Star nomination for the Thunderbirds. He also earned all-region honors after passing for 2,100 yards with 22 touchdowns and rushed for two touchdowns his senior season in leading Timpview to a 12–1 record. Affleck threw for 4,200 yards and 37 touchdowns in his career. He won the Utah Valley Golden Arm for Most Outstanding Quarterback his senior year and was the MVP of the Colorado Nike Camp in 2002. He also Lettered in both basketball and baseball, earning second-team all-region honors in baseball. Affleck appeared at the Elite 11 quarterback camp in 2002. He graduated from Timpview High School in 2003.

College career
Affleck was redshirted in 2003 as a member of the Arizona State Sun Devils of Arizona State University. He transferred to play for the BYU Cougars of Brigham Young University in 2004. He played for the Dixie State Red Storm of Dixie State College in 2005. Affleck transferred to play for the Utah State Aggies of Utah State University from 2006 to 2007.

Professional career
Affleck played for the Utah Valley Thunder of the American Indoor Football Association in 2009. The Thunder finished with an 11–4 record and a berth in the playoffs. He led the AIFA in passing efficiency at 109.6. He was second in the league in passing yards with 3,037 and was third in touchdown passes with 48. Affleck also rushed for 15 touchdowns.

Affleck signed with the Utah Blaze in January 2010. In four games for the Blaze, he completed 39-of-73 passes for 441 yards, seven touchdowns and three interceptions. He was released by the Blaze in June 2010.

References

External links
Just Sports Stats
College stats

Living people
1984 births
Players of American football from Utah
American football quarterbacks
Arizona State Sun Devils football players
BYU Cougars football players
Utah Tech Trailblazers football players
Utah State Aggies football players
Utah Blaze players
Sportspeople from Provo, Utah